Erol Demir (born 18 September 1970) is a former Macedonian footballer.

Club career
Demir made his debut with one appearance for FK Vardar in the 1988–89 Yugoslav First League. He played with Vardar in the Yugoslav league system until 1991.

During the 1990s besides Vardar he also played with Serbian side FK Železnik in the 1997–98 First League of FR Yugoslavia.

Later, he also played in Croatia with NK Čakovec in the 2000–01 Prva HNL.

International career
At national team level, Demir made an appearance for Yugoslavia U21 in 1990.

Personal life
His son, Benjamin Demir, is also a footballer.

References

External links
 

1970 births
Living people
Association football defenders
Macedonian footballers
Yugoslav footballers
Yugoslavia under-21 international footballers
FK Vardar players
FK Železnik players
NK Čakovec players
Yugoslav First League players
First League of Serbia and Montenegro players
Croatian Football League players
Macedonian expatriate footballers
Expatriate footballers in Serbia and Montenegro
Macedonian expatriate sportspeople in Serbia and Montenegro
Expatriate footballers in Croatia
Macedonian expatriate sportspeople in Croatia